Bad Karma is the second extended play by singer-songwriter Gabbie Hanna, released on May 15, 2020. The EP includes the five songs "Dandelion", "Glass House", "Bad Karma", "Special", and "Happy". The EP peaked at number 45 on the US Top Current Albums chart, and at number 22 on the Heatseekers Albums chart.

Background and promotion 
On March 19, 2020, Hanna teased she would release an EP, due to the COVID-19 pandemic delaying the release of her debut album, This Time Next Year. The EP's lead single, "Dandelion", was released on April 17, 2020, alongside a music video animated by Hokuto Konishi. "Glass House" was released as the EP's second single on May 1, 2020, alongside a music video.

Music videos 
All five songs on the EP have a music video. The music video for "Dandelion" was released on April 17, 2020, and the music video for "Glass House" was released on May 1, 2020. On May 16, 2020, the music video for "Bad Karma" was released, alongside the EP. The music videos for "Special" and "Happy" were released on June 14, 2020 and September 1, 2020, respectively.

Track listing

Charts

References 

2020 EPs
Gabbie Hanna albums

Pop music EPs